Gowhargan may refer to:
 Gowhargan-e Sofla